Paraphaenops breuilianus is a species of beetle in the family Carabidae, the only species in the genus Paraphaenops.

References

Trechinae